Genesee Mountain Park Training Annex (1955–70) was a U.S. Air Force radar station, an outstation of Lowry Air Force Base.

Early in the Cold War, Lowry AFB supported Strategic Air Command nuclear bomber training (e.g., B-47, B-52, etc.) with automatic tracking radar (autotrack) and by January 1962, the "Tactical Missile School at Lowry" conducted Matador missile training  "in the Black Hangar" (the surface-to-surface missile used Matador Automatic Radar Control for autotrack.)  Automatic tracking radar was also used in Korean War ground-directed bombing training for live bomb drops at ranges like the Lowry Bombing and Gunnery Range (the early 1960s Titan 1 sites near Denver also had tracking radars in a "guidance facility".)

Denver Bomb Plot
The Denver Bomb Plot was the call sign of an early Cold War automatic tracking radar station established for training and evaluation by August 25, 1949. The station was operated by Detachment A of the 3903rd Radar Bomb Scoring Squadron, was commanded by Capt John A. Schlupp in 1949, and conducted Radar Bomb Scoring of simulated bomb drops on mock Denver area targets by Strategic Air Command aircrews, including those of the 1955 SAC Bombing and Navigation Competition.  In 1959 the detachment moved 4 trailers, after being designated Detachment 1, 11th Radar Bomb Scoring Squadron; to the La Junta Radar Bomb Scoring Site at the former World War II La Junta Army Airfield (122 people on 6 acres in FY1984).

References

Installations of the United States Air Force in Colorado
Formerly Used Defense Sites
Buildings and structures in Jefferson County, Colorado
Radar stations of the United States Air Force
Military installations closed in 1970
Military installations in Colorado